Mary Heimann is an American historian and Professor of Modern History at Cardiff University. She is particularly noted for her controversial book, Czechoslovakia: The State That Failed.

Books
Catholic Devotion in Victorian England. Oxford University Press, Oxford 1995.
Czechoslovakia: The State That Failed. Yale University Press, New Haven, CT 2011.
Československo – stát, ktery zklamal. Petrkov, Havlíčkův Brod 2020.

References

External links
 Information about the researcher by Mary Heimann herself 
 Information about the researcher at Cardiff University

1962 births
Scientists from The Hague
Living people
American historians
American women historians
Academics of Cardiff University